Corey J. Foster (born October 27, 1969) is a Canadian former ice hockey defenceman.

Playing career
Foster was drafted 12th overall by the New Jersey Devils in the 1988 NHL Entry Draft. As well as the Devils, he played in the National Hockey League for the Philadelphia Flyers, Pittsburgh Penguins and the New York Islanders. He played a total of 45 regular season games, scoring 5 goals and 11 points, he also played 3 playoff games for Pittsburgh during the 1995–96 NHL season. After leaving the Islanders, Foster spent four seasons playing in Japan and also played in Germany's Deutsche Eishockey Liga for one season. He retired in 2005 after a season with Elmira Jackals.

Career statistics

Regular season and playoffs

International

External links
 

1969 births
Living people
Berlin Capitals players
Canadian ice hockey defencemen
Cape Breton Oilers players
Cleveland Lumberjacks players
Elmira Jackals (UHL) players
Hershey Bears players
Kokudo Keikaku players
Ice hockey people from Ottawa
National Hockey League first-round draft picks
Nippon Paper Cranes players
New Jersey Devils draft picks
New Jersey Devils players
New York Islanders players
Peterborough Petes (ice hockey) players
Philadelphia Flyers players
Pittsburgh Penguins players
Prince Edward Island Senators players
Springfield Falcons players
Canadian expatriate ice hockey players in Germany
Canadian expatriate ice hockey players in the United States